Hanthawaddy United Football Club is a Burmese football club, based in Taungoo, Myanmar, and represents the Bago Region. The club was a founding member of the Myanmar National League (MNL) in 2009.

Sponsorship

Club

Coaching staff
{|class="wikitable"
|-
!Position
!Staff
|-
|Manager|| U Ngwe Tun
|-
|rowspan="3"|Assistant Manager|| U Kyaw Soe Oo
|-
| U Tun Min Oo
|-
|
|-
|Goalkeeper Coach|| 
|-
|Media Officer|| U Min Min Tun
|-
|Technical Director|| Sivrji
|-

Other information

|-

Current squad
This is current squad for MNL 2016 season.

Players

References
HU FC

External links
Pages
Fan pages

Hanthawaddy United